Krumvíř is a municipality and village in Břeclav District in the South Moravian Region of the Czech Republic. It has about 1,200 inhabitants. It it known for its viticulture.

Notable people
Jakub Šebesta (born 1948), politician
Milan Heča (born 1991), footballer

References

External links

 

Villages in Břeclav District
Moravian Slovakia